Trametes cubensis is a poroid bracket fungus in the family Polyporaceae. It was first described in 1837 as Polyporus cubensis by Camille Montagne. Pier Andrea Saccardo transferred it to the genus Trametes in 1891.

References

Polyporaceae
Fungi described in 1837
Fungi of North America
Fungi of South America
Taxa named by Camille Montagne